Helnæs is an island on the southwestern coast of Funen, Denmark, southwest of Haarby and northwest of Faaborg. It belongs administratively to Assens Municipality and is connected to the town of Assens by road to the north.

Geography
Between Helnæs and the main island of Funen is Helnæs Bay, which contains the sprawling islands of Illumø, Horsehoved and Vigø to the southeast. The principal settlement of Helnæs lies on the southeast coast, and contains the camping site Helnæs Camping to the north of it, although the historical village of Helnæs By is further to the north, inland.

Landmarks
There is a runestone on the island, known as the Helnæs Runestone.

References

Islands of Denmark
Geography of Assens Municipality